Arina Valeryevna Martynova (born 27 February 1990 in Moscow) is a Russian figure skater. She is the 2006 Nebelhorn Trophy silver medalist and competed at four ISU Championships. She was coached by Svetlana Sokolovskaya from 2004 to 2006, by Marina Kudriavtseva from 2006 to 2008, and by Viktoria Volchkova in the 2008–09 season.

Programs

Competitive highlights 
GP: Grand Prix; JGP: Junior Grand Prix

References

External links 

 
 Official Russian site

1990 births
Living people
Russian female single skaters
Figure skaters from Moscow
Competitors at the 2009 Winter Universiade